{{Taxobox
| name = Enochrus esuriens
| image = Enochrus esuriens (Walket, 1858) (14920572873).png
| image_caption = 
| regnum = Animalia
| phylum = Arthropoda
| classis = Insecta
| ordo = Coleoptera
| subordo = Polyphaga
| superfamilia = Hydrophiloidea
| familia = Hydrophilidae
| genus = Enochrus
| species = E. esuriens
| binomial = Enochrus esuriens
| binomial_authority = (Walker, 1858)
| synonyms = * Philhydrus esuriens Walker, 1858
 Enochrus esuriens Kniž, 1924
 Pylophilus nigriceps Motschulsky, 1860
 Philhydrus nigriceps Redtenbacher, 1868
 Philhydrus pullus Fauvel, 1883
 Philhydrus ornaticeps Sharp, 1884
 Philydrus pullus Fauvel, 1883
 Philydrus ornaticeps Sharp, 1884
}}Enochrus (Methydrus) esuriens'', is a species of water scavenger beetle found in Indochina, Korea, China, Japan, Bhutan, Iran, Iraq, Nepal, India, Pakistan, Philippines, Sri Lanka, Vietnam, Sunda Island, Saudi Arabia and Australia.

Description
Body length is about 2.4 to 2.8 mm. Body oval and convex. Dorsum yellowish brown whereas ventrum blackish. Head dark with preocular spots. Mentum consists with compact long setae on anterior part. Pronotum without a central dark spot. Elytra without stria. Mesoventral process is protruded posteriorly, with characteristic beak-shaped with sparse setae. Abdomen consists with five vetrites and zig-zag shaped maxillary palpi. Sternite VII with emargination visible in between apex and medial part. Median lobe of aedeagus in male is long and triangular along with reversed U-shaped and relatively thick corona.

It is inhabited in both brackish and fresh water.

References 

Hydrophilidae
Insects of Sri Lanka
Insects described in 1858